Ten10 is the fourth studio album by British rapper Chip. It was released on 21 September 2018 by Cash Motto Limited. It succeeds Chip's third album, League of My Own II, released in 2017. The album consists of ten tracks with production from The Fanatix, Lil Silva and Sampha, alongside guest appearances from B Young, Frisco, Jme, Not3s and Red Rat.

Background
The album was announced on 23 August 2018, alongside availability to pre-order. Commenting on the album, Chip stated: "It's my first clinically precise album. Ten10 — as in ten out of ten — has ten tracks, each track being a ten-ten representation of versatility, growth, lyricism, unique production and pushing boundaries creatively, as well as me recently touching the cusp of ten years in my career."

Release and promotion
The first single, "Darth Vader", was released on 14 June 2018 for streaming and digital download, alongside a music video. Alongside the announcement of the album, the second single "My Girl" featuring Jamaican dancehall artist Red Rat was released on 24 August 2018.

Track listing

Charts

Release history

References

2018 albums
Chipmunk (rapper) albums